Meadowridge Library is a public library in the suburb of Meadowridge, in Cape Town, South Africa. It has 8,112 members, and was ranked 14th in the City of Cape Town's top 20 circulating libraries in 2014, out of the city's 101 libraries.

The library, established in January 1960, is open 45 hours a week, and currently provides work to 11 employees and 10 volunteers. It offers books, DVDs, CDs, audiobooks, and magazines for loan. The library holds 78,106 items. Meadowridge Library's holdings can be searched online via the City of Cape Town's Open Public Access Catalogue (OPAC)

Meadowridge library is in close proximity to a number of schools, including Bergvliet Primary School, Bergvliet High School, Westcott Primary School, Sweet Valley Primary School, and the American International School of Cape Town. The library serves a large community, with many neighboring suburbs not having libraries of their own.

Facilities
Meadowridge Library has its own parking area and a dedicated children's library, positioned separately to the main library area.

The library has three computers available for public use. Members of the public can become library members, and then register, using their library card, to use the computers via Cape Town's Smart Cape initiative.

Community programs
Meadowridge Library's hosts weekly storytelling sessions every Wednesday in its children's section, attended by children from a neighboring preschool, as well as others from surrounding areas. Local authors occasionally attend the sessions and read their books.

The library also hosts regular book sales, class visits, educational holiday programs, library orientation sessions for local school children, flea markets, computer classes and reading programs.

Meadowridge Library staff regularly take part in outreach programs. One of the staff assists with Help-to-Read tuition at a local school on a weekly basis. The library hosts an annual Reading Competition in April, sponsored by the local ward councillor, in which grade seven students from four disadvantaged schools participate. One of the library's volunteers runs a free  Xhosa class every Tuesday evening. During the last quarter of the school year, the library is involved in Capricorn Park Primary School's Career Day.

During the Library and Information Association of South Africa's South African Library Week, which takes place each year during the week of the 20th of March, Meadowridge Library joins with other Cape Town libraries to promote the library service at a Meadowridge shopping center.

In October 2015, Meadowridge Library partnered with the South African Association of Women Graduates and the Project for the Study of Alternative Education in South Africa to run an educational program at the library for 35 girls from Khayelitsha and Kraaifontein.

Gallery

References

External links
 Library map: Cape Town and surrounds

Libraries in Cape Town
Meadowridge